John Scott Martin (1 April 1926 – 6 January 2009) was an English actor born in Toxteth, Liverpool, Lancashire. He made many film, stage and television appearances, but one of his most famous, though unseen, roles was as a Dalek operator in the long-running BBC science fiction television series Doctor Who.

Martin operated Daleks from 1965's The Chase through 1988's Remembrance of the Daleks making him the longest-running Dalek operator. He worked with eight different actors in the title role of The Doctor from William Hartnell to Sylvester McCoy, and also Richard Hurndall, who took on the role of the First Doctor in "The Five Doctors". Typically, Martin would operate the first Dalek when a group of three entered a scene, due largely to his long tenure on the programme. He also operated other Doctor Who monster costumes including the insectoid Zarbi in The Web Planet, and the robotic Mechanoids in The Chase. Martin made his first on screen appearance in The Dæmons, in which he appeared (uncredited) as Charlie, postmaster of Devils End, in three episodes. Martin also had a cameo in the BBC series The Tripods.

Some of his other television credits include various roles in I, Claudius, Z-Cars and Softly, Softly, as well as a TV Technician in Quatermass and the Pit, as Brown in Some Mothers Do 'Ave 'Em, as a waiter in The Good Life, as Hawke in Poldark (1977) and as Rico Vivaldi in five episodes of the 2004 comedy Mine All Mine, written by Russell T. Davies.

His film credits include a dancing instructor in a brief scene in Alan Parker's film adaption of Pink Floyd's The Wall, and small roles in Ali G Indahouse, Little Shop of Horrors, Erik the Viking and The Crimson Permanent Assurance segment of The Meaning of Life.

He appeared on the West End stage in shows like Kismet, Oliver! and The Streets of London. In the Manchester Opera House production of Fiddler on the Roof featuring Topol in the starring role, he played the Rabbi.

Martin suffered from Parkinson's disease in later life. He died on 6 January 2009.

Partial filmography
 The Blood Beast Terror (1968) - Snaflebum
 The Private Life of Sherlock Holmes (1970) - Scientist (uncredited)
  Jude the Obscure (1971) - Doctor
 No Sex Please, We're British (1973) - White Line Workman
 Pink Floyd – The Wall (1982) - Dancing Teacher
 Monty Python's The Meaning of Life (1983) - (segment "The Crimson Permanent Assurance")
 Young Sherlock Holmes (1985) - Cemetery Caretaker
 Little Shop of Horrors (1986) - 'Downtown' Bum #3
 Little Dorrit (1987) - Faded Insolvent
 Erik the Viking (1989) - Ingemund the Old
 Bullseye! (1990) - Old Jeweller
 Beg! (1994) - Nightwatchman
 Out of Depth (2000) - Joe
 Ali G Indahouse (2001) - Mr. Johnson

Notes

External links

77-year-old Dalek veteran offers to appear in new series BBC News story

1926 births
2009 deaths
People from Toxteth
Male actors from Liverpool
English male film actors
English male stage actors
English male television actors